, known as
, is a Japanese animator, filmmaker, author, and manga artist.

Shinkai began his career as a video game animator with Nihon Falcom in 1996, and gained recognition as a filmmaker with the release of the original video animation (OVA) She and Her Cat (1999). Beginning his longstanding association with CoMix Wave Films, Shinkai then released the science-fiction OVA Voices of a Distant Star in 2002, and followed this with his debut feature film The Place Promised in Our Early Days (2004).

Shinkai's second feature film, the romantic drama anthology 5 Centimeters per Second (2007), gained critical acclaim, as did his subsequent releases, the dramas Children Who Chase Lost Voices (2011) and The Garden of Words (2013). Shinkai's 2016 fantasy romance Your Name was a critical and commercial success, becoming the third highest-grossing anime film of all time. His 2019 film, Weathering with You, also achieved similar critical and commercial success. His seventh film, Suzume, was released in Japan in November 2022.

Early life
A native of Nagano Prefecture, Shinkai studied Japanese literature at Chuo University, where he was a member of the juvenile literature club and drew picture books. He traces his passion for creation to the manga, anime and novels he was exposed to in middle school. His favorite anime films are Laputa: Castle in the Sky, Nausicaä and The Castle of Cagliostro by Hayao Miyazaki, The End of Evangelion by Hideaki Anno and Patlabor 2 by Mamoru Oshii.

Career 
After graduating from Chuo University Faculty of Literature in March 1996, he got a job at Falcom, a video game company where he worked for 5 years making video clips for games and graphic design including web content. During this time he met musician Tenmon, who later scored many of his movies.

In 1999, Shinkai released She and Her Cat, a five-minute short piece done in monochrome. It won several awards, including the grand prize at the 12th DoGA CG Animation contest (2000). DoGA is an independent nonprofit company set up to encourage entry-level animators with software and advice. The short details the life of a cat, entirely from the cat's perspective, as it passes time with its owner, a young woman.

After winning the grand prize, Shinkai began thinking about a follow-up while he continued working for Falcom. In June 2000, Shinkai was inspired to begin Voices of a Distant Star by drawing a picture of a girl in a cockpit grasping a cell phone. Some time later, he was contacted by Manga Zoo (today a smartphone app), which offered to work with him, giving him a grant to turn his idea into an anime they could sell. In May 2001, he quit his job at Falcom and began to work on Voices. In an interview, Shinkai noted that production took around seven months of "real work".

Voices of a Distant Star was followed by the 90-minute The Place Promised in Our Early Days, which was released nationwide in Japan on November 20, 2004. It was critically acclaimed, winning many honors. Shinkai's next project was 5 Centimeters per Second and premiered 3 March 2007. It consists of three short films: Cherry Blossom, Cosmonaut, and 5 Centimeters per Second. The total run time is about 63 minutes. In September 2007 Nagano's leading newspaper, Shinano Mainichi Shinbun, released a TV commercial animated by Shinkai.

Shinkai spent 2008 in London, resting since the completion of 5 Centimeters per Second. He returned to Japan in 2009 to start work on his next project. He released two concept drawings for this film in December 2009. Shinkai noted that it would be his longest animation film to date and described the story as a "lively" animated film with adventure, action, and romance centered on a cheerful and spirited girl on a journey to say "farewell". In November 2010, he revealed that his next work would be titled Children Who Chase Lost Voices from Deep Below. A teaser trailer was released on November 9, and the film was released on May 7, 2011.

His next feature, The Garden of Words, was released on May 31, 2013.

On August 26, 2016, Shinkai released Your Name. The film received positive reviews, praising the film for its narrative, imagery, animation, music, emotional weight, and skillful use of post-postmodernist themes. The film was also a commercial success, becoming the fifth-highest-grossing film of all time in Japan. Then by 2019, the film became the highest-grossing anime film worldwide of all time, overtaking Miyazaki's Spirited Away.

Shinkai's next project Weathering with You was released on July 19, 2019 in Japan.

Shinkai's next film Suzume was released in Japan on November 11, 2022.

Personal life
Shinkai has been called "The New Miyazaki" in several reviews, including those by Anime Advocates and ActiveAnime—comparisons he calls an "overestimation".

He is married to retired actress and producer Chieko Misaka, star of films including Versus by Ryuhei Kitamura; they have a daughter, child actress Chise Niitsu (born 2010).

An asteroid, 55222 Makotoshinkai is named after him.

Works

Film

Video games

Commercials

Literary works

Manga

Illustrations 
  — Illustrator (2003–2011)

Accolades

Notes

References

External links 

 Makoto Shinkai's Website  
 Makoto Shinkai's Official Portal
 
 
 
 
 Entry in  The Encyclopedia of Science Fiction

1973 births
Anime directors
Chuo University alumni
Fantasy artists
Japanese animators
Japanese illustrators
Japanese speculative fiction artists
Living people
Manga artists
People from Nagano Prefecture